Old Parliament Building (Quebec) was the site of the seat of government of Lower Canada (1791-1833), Canada West, Province of Canada and Quebec (1867-1883).

It was located in what is Parc Montmorency today, the site of two Parliament buildings from 1791 to 1883 at the Chapel of Bishop's Palace and later within the grounds of the Bishop's Palace.

History

The first building on the site was the Chapel of Bishop's Palace, which was ordered built by Bishop Saint-Vallier from 1693 to 1695 to replace a stone house purchased by Saint-Vallier in 1688. 

In 1777 the building was rented to the British government to house the Legislative Council under orders from then Governor General Guy Carleton, 1st Baron Dorchester. From 1791 to 1838 it was home to the House of Assembly and Legislative Council of Lower Canada.

Chronology of Parliament Buildings of Quebec

1st Parliament Buildings:

 1777 British government rents the Chapel of Bishop's Palace within the Episcopal Palace of Quebec for the Legislative Council
 1830s demolition of Chapel of Bishop's Palace (1833) and addition added with new main building and first wing of new Parliament Buildings to the Episcopal Palace (1830-1831)
 1840 Quebec no longer capital and buildings becomes vacant with the establishment of the Province of Canada (rotated between Kingston, Montreal and Toronto)
 1852 Parliament returns to the Episcopal Palace site and new Parliament still under construction
 1852–1853 Episcopal Palace is demolished as new Parliament construction continues
 1854 new Parliament Buildings nearing completion but destroyed by fire
 1854–1859 Parliament relocates to two locations:
 Quebec Music Hall (or Academy of Music) on rue St. Louis - a three-storey Greek Revival structure built by Charles Baillairge from 1851 to 1853; it burned down in 1900
 Quebec City Courthouse – a three-storey wooden building built between 1799 and 1804; it burned down in 1873 (now home to Old Courthouse of Quebec)

2nd Parliament Buildings:

 1859–1860 new Parliament Building at Côte de la Montagne completed and served sessions from 1860 to 1865
 1866 capital of the province of Canada moves to Ottawa for final time (and becomes federal Parliament in 1867), and Quebec buildings becomes vacant briefly
 1867–1883 the province of Quebec is created and the Parliament Buildings is designated home to new provincial Parliament
 1883 Parliament Buildings destroyed in fire and relocated to the current buildings (began construction in 1877 and nearing completion
 1884 – Parliament moved to the current Parliament Building (Quebec); the old building is demolished and reopened known as Parc Montmorency in 1894

The 2nd parliament building was a Greek Revival structure with a dome in the central structure flanked by two wings. Built between 1830 and 1850, it was destroyed by a fire in 1854.

The building's interior is featured in Robert Harris' 1884 painting "Conference at Quebec in 1864.

References

External links
 
 * Parliament of Canada (Montmorency Park)

Buildings and structures in Quebec City
Former seats of national legislatures
Legislative buildings in Canada
Demolished buildings and structures in Canada
Greek Revival architecture in Canada
Quebec Legislature
Province of Canada
Burned buildings and structures in Canada